Fabrice Santoro defeated Arnaud Clément 6–3, 4–6, 6–4 to win the 1999 Open 13 singles competition. Thomas Enqvist was the champion but did not defend his title.

Seeds

Draw

Finals

Top half

Bottom half

External links
 1999 Open 13 Singles draw

Singles
Open 13